Nässuma Airfield (also Nässuma Airstrip) is an airfield (airstrip) in Nässuma, Saare County, Estonia.

The airfield's owner is Maret Allik, code LCL: AG1192.

References

Airports in Estonia
Buildings and structures in Saare County